The 2017–18 CSKA season was the 26th successive season that the club played in the Russian Premier League, the highest tier of association football in Russia. CSKA finished the previous season in 2nd, and as a result entered the Champions League at the Third Qualifying stage, and also took part in the Russian Cup.

Squad

Out on loan

Transfers

In

Out

Loans in

Loans out

Released

 Wernbloom, Milanov and Natkho's contract expiry was announced on the above date, and came into play on 30 June.

Trial

Friendlies

Competitions

Russian Premier League

Results by round

Matches

League table

Russian Cup

UEFA Champions League

Qualifying rounds

Group stage

UEFA Europa League

Knockout phase

Squad statistics

Appearances and goals

|-
|colspan="14"|Players away from the club on loan:

|}

Goalscorers

Disciplinary record

References

PFC CSKA Moscow seasons
CSKA Moscow
CSKA Moscow